Live at the Fillmore is a live double album by Derek and the Dominos, recorded in two performances in October 1970 at the Fillmore East and released on 22 February 1994. It includes live material previously released on the In Concert album, live material previously released on Eric Clapton's Crossroads box set, and several previously unreleased numbers.

The set-list contains eight Derek and the Dominos songs (six from the album Layla and Other Assorted Love Songs, plus "Roll It Over" and "Got to Get Better in a Little While"), three tunes from Clapton's first solo album (on which the other three band members had played), and one song from two bands to which Clapton had previously belonged ("Presence of The Lord" from Blind Faith; and a different arrangement of Robert Johnson's song, "Crossroads" that Clapton had previously covered with Cream).

Steve Guttenberg noted on The Audiophiliac YouTube channel on January 15, 2023, that the concert came three weeks after Jimi Hendrix had died. The band included "Little Wing", a Hendrix song that was among its repertoire.

Track listing

Disc 1
 "Got to Get Better in a Little While" (Eric Clapton) – 13:52 *
 "Why Does Love Got to Be So Sad?" (Clapton, Bobby Whitlock) – 14:49 +
 "Key to the Highway" (Big Bill Broonzy, Charles Segar) – 6:25 **
 "Blues Power" (Clapton, Leon Russell) – 10:31 *
 "Have You Ever Loved a Woman" (Billy Myles) – 8:16 *
 "Bottle of Red Wine" (Clapton, Bonnie Bramlett) – 5:34 *

Disc 2
 "Tell the Truth" (Clapton, Whitlock) – 11:28 +
 "Nobody Knows You When You're Down and Out" (Jimmy Cox) – 5:33 +
 "Roll It Over" (Clapton, Whitlock) – 6:40 *
 "Presence of the Lord" (Clapton) – 6:16 *
 "Little Wing" (Jimi Hendrix) – 7:00 +
 "Let It Rain" (Clapton, Bramlett) – 19:46 +
 "Crossroads" (Robert Johnson, arranged by Clapton) – 8:29 **

October 23, 1970 (second show): 1-1, 1-2, 1-6, 2-1, 2-5, 2-6, 2-7
October 24, 1970 (second show): 1-3, 1-4, 1-5, 2-2, 2-3, 2-4 
(*) Appeared on Derek and the Dominos 1973 album In Concert 
(**) Appeared on Eric Clapton's 1988 boxset Crossroads 
(+) Previously unreleased

Personnel 
According to liner notes:
Eric Clapton – guitar and vocals
Bobby Whitlock – keyboards and vocals
Carl Radle – bass guitar
Jim Gordon – drums

Production 
Bill Levenson: producer
Eddie Kramer: engineer
Anthony DeCurtis: liner notes
Jay Mark: digital remix engineer

References

Derek and the Dominos live albums
Live at the Fillmore East albums
1994 live albums
Polydor Records live albums